Teegarden is an unincorporated community in Columbiana County, in the U.S. state of Ohio.

History
A post office called Teegarden was established in 1870, and remained in operation until 1929. Teegarden was located on the Erie Railroad. Uriah Teegarden was a local landowner near the Teegarden Station.

References

Unincorporated communities in Columbiana County, Ohio
1870 establishments in Ohio
Unincorporated communities in Ohio